The University "Marta Abreu" of Las Villas (UCLV) is an undergraduate and graduate public university located in Santa Clara, Cuba, founded in 1952 and having a remote campus called "Universidad de Montaña" located in Topes de Collantes, the heart of the Escambray Mountains.

Organization
The university academic programs are divided into 13 departments with an added program in the Department of Humanities which offers a bachelor's degree in journalism.

 Faculty of Electrical Engineering
 Faculty of Mechanical Engineering
 Faculty of Mathematics – Physics – Computer Science 
 Faculty of Industrial Engineering and Tourism
 Faculty of Chemistry – Pharmacy
 Faculty of Construction Engineering
 Faculty of Agriculture
 Faculty of Economics
 Faculty of Humanities
 Faculty of Social Sciences
 Faculty of Psychology
 Faculty of Law
 Faculty of Information Science and Education

See also 

Education in Cuba
List of universities in Cuba

References

External links

 University "Maria Abreu" Website

Santa Clara
University Marta Abreu of Las Villas
Educational institutions established in 1952
1952 establishments in Cuba